Navid Pourfaraj (born April 26, 1988) is an Iranian-Kurdish actor. He is best known for his role as Amir in Sheeple (2018) for which he earned a Crystal Simorgh, a Hafez Award, an Iran Cinema Celebration Award and an Iran's Film Critics and Writers Association Award nominations. He won the Best Actor Award at the 8th Duhok International Film Festival for his acting in Zalava (2021).

Filmography

Film

Television

Awards and nominations

References

External links 

 

Iranian male television actors
Iranian male film actors
People from Kermanshah
Living people
1988 births